Channel [V] India was an Indian television channel affiliated to the international Channel [V] launched on 27 May 1994, as Channel [V] South Beam on the AsiaSat 2 satellite. The channel owned by STAR India and 21st Century Fox broadcasts a mix of music and original fiction programs. From an international music channel in its early days to a Bollywood music driven one to a youth oriented entertainment is the path it had taken.

On 1 July 2012, Channel [V] India discontinued music programming. However, Channel [V] International continue to air music programming in India for those with C/Ku band satellite dishes until its cessation on 1 October 2021. It started focusing on original content through fiction dailies and studio formats that addressed youth issues. However On 30 June 2016, the channel discontinued fiction dailies and studio formats and reverted to a 24-hour music-channel format.

On 1 August 2016, the channel changed its look and logo and continued music programming which plays latest Indian and International hits catering to the tastes of the discerning Indian youth. The channel was shut down on 15 September 2018 and Star Sports relaunched Star Sports 3 for the first time in 2013.

Programming

 Artist Tree
 Axe Ur Ex
 Best Friends Forever?
 The Buddy Project
 Cabaret
 Catch 22
 Channel V Presents Bollywood Nonsensex
 Coke V Popstars
 Confessions of an Indian Teenager
 Crazy Stupid Ishq
 D4
 Dance with V 
 Dare 2 Date
 Dil Dosti Dance
 Channel V Freedom Express
 Friends: Conditions apply
 Videocon Flashback
 Get Gorgeous
 Gumrah: End of Innocence
 Hit Machine
 Humse Hai Liife
 Ishq Unplugged
 It's Complicated – Relationships Ka Naya Status
 Jhalli Anjali Ke Tootey Dil Ki Amazing Story
 The Juice
 Late Night V    
 Mastaangi
 Meri Life Meri Choice
 Million Dollar Girl
 Most Wanted
 O Gujariya: Badlein Chal Duniya
 Paanch 5 Wrongs Make A Right
 PS I hate you
 Roomies
 Sadda Haq 
 Secret Diaries
 Simpoo     
 Stay Tuned                                    
 Suvreen Guggal – Topper of The Year
 Swim Team
 Tony B Show
 Twist Wala Love
 The Udham Singh Show
 V Day Trippin with the Stars
 V Distraction
 V Hangover
 V International
 V Non-Stop
 V The Player
V Rush
 V Shuffle
 V The Serial
 Ye Parindey
 Winner Mangta Hai
 Yeh Jawani Ta Ra Ri Ri

Notable VJ's

Ruby Bhatia
Vekeana Dhillon
VIkram Dhillon
Aditya Roy Kapoor
Laila Rouass
Anuradha Menon (Lola Kutty)
Sarah-Jane Dias
Meghna Reddy
Nina Manuel
Anushka Manchanda
Juhi Pande 
Shruti Seth
Gaurav Kapur
Ranvir Shorey
Vinay Pathak
VJ Andy
Luke Kenny
VJ Yudhistir
Manish Makhija (Udham Singh)
Purab Kohli
Sophiya Haque
V Bai
VJ Nonie
Kim Jagtiani

See also
 MTV India
 VH1

References

External links
 Channel V shows Streaming on Hotstar
 Channel V India 

Television channels and stations established in 1994
1994 establishments in Maharashtra
Former subsidiaries of The Walt Disney Company
Television stations in Mumbai
Television channels and stations disestablished in 2018
Defunct television channels in India
Channel V India original programming